Angelle is a surname and given name. Notable people with the name include:

 Angelle (singer) (born Sarah Davies), British singer
 Angelle Sampey (born 1970), American motorcycle racer
 Angelle Tymon (born 1983), American journalist
 Felecia Angelle (born 1986), American voice actor
 Lisa Angelle (born 1965), American musician
 Scott Angelle (born 1961), American politician

See also
 Angel (disambiguation)
 Angell (disambiguation)